Oka Manasu is a 2016 Telugu film written and directed by G. V. Rama Raju. It features Naga Shourya and Niharika Konidela in the lead roles, which marks Niharika debut in Telugu cinema. The film was released worldwide on 24 June 2016.

Plot 
Sandhya, a medical student falls deeply in love at first sight with Surya who is a youngster with political aspirations. Surya does small-time ‘settlements’ as he awaits a chance to contest at the local elections. Sandhya understands that the path ahead of her is not easy when she sees Surya roughing up people every now and then. Her mother suggests Surya to leave politics for her daughter but Surya does not agree and follows his path because of his father's wish to see his son as an M.L.A. During one of the settlements which later becomes a serious issue leading to FIR being filed on Surya for S.C., S.T. Atrocities and he is arrested on those charges. After knowing Surya's arrest Sandya decides to wait for him but her mother convinces her to shift from Vijaya nagaram to vizag on hopes to forget Surya. 3 years Later with the help of his uncle who is an M.L.A. belonging to the opposition party in vizag, using his high influence Surya is released on bail, and tries to make a settlement to cancel the case on him. He learns that one of his friends betrayed him for his political aspirations and became an approver and  he is now a municipal chairman to the Vijayanagara district. Surya meets him for a compromise, it leads to a fight and the situation becomes worse. Surya's father appoints Satya, a practical man with no sentiments, as his advisor. They become good friends rather than a boss and employee because of Satya's straight forward nature and his loyalty towards him. Later in Vizag Surya meets Sandya, he advises Sandya to leave him because of his situation as there is no guarantee on his future but Sandya refuses to leave him and replies that she will wait for him for her entire life. Satya supports her decision and advises Surya keep it as a secret until the problem is solved. Surya and Sandya starts a live-in relationship without her mother's will. Surya starts helping in his uncle's election campaign.

During the election campaign a person starts attacking Surya's uncle who once expected a M.L.A. ticket but was refused under the grounds of financial backup. Surya protects his uncle and beats the person up. Satya understands that he is showing his frustration on him because of Sandya. Impressed by his actions, Surya's uncle gives him an opportunity to contest as an M.L.A. and is ready to make him his political heir on the condition that Surya marry his daughter who is a spoilt divorcée. Surya's father and Satya support this and tries to convince Surya for the marriage as this will solve his case and to achieve his ambition. Surya refuses to betray Sandya, but remembers his father's dream and lies to her that his bail was cancelled. He instructs to start a new life without him, but Sandya does not listen to him and tells him that she will wait for him forever. Later, through Surya's father she understands his situation (Surya's father knew their relationship through Surya earlier). Sandya decides to leave him but for two conditions, i.e., he must achieve his ambition and she asks him to spend some time with him for a couple of days and he accepts.

After two days, in the morning when Surya tries to wake her up on the bed, realises that she committed suicide. He finds a note beside her which tells him that she has fulfilled her dreams with him and she will wait for him in the next life. The film ends with Surya remembering her memories on her grave.

Cast 
Naga Shourya as Surya
Niharika Konidela as Sandhya
Rao Ramesh as Surya's father
Krishna Bhagavan
Radio Mirchi RJ Hemanth
Srinivas Avasarala as Satya
Vennela Kishore
Pragathi as Sandhya's mother
Roshan Kanakala

Soundtrack
Oka Manasu's audio has nine tracks, all composed by Sunil Kashyap. Songs were penned by Ramajogayya Sastry and Bhaskarabhatla Ravikumar. The music was launched on May 18, 2016 with members of mega families like Nagendra Babu, Ram Charan, Varun Tej, Sai Dharam Tej, Allu Arjun as chief guests.

The album received positive reviews from the audiences.

References

External links 
 

2016 films
2010s Telugu-language films